Bridgeway my refer to:

Bridgeway Capital Management, American investment management firm
Bridgeway Foundation, charity founded by Shannon Sedgwick Davis and financed by Bridgeway Capital Management
Bridgeway, series of businesses in India, UAE and Saudi Arabia by Indian businessman, entrepreneur and politician P. V. Abdul Wahab  
Bridgeway, Montreal-based Canadian band